Tonnesen or Tønnesen is a Norwegian surname that may refer to

Ambrosia Tønnesen (1859-1948), Norwegian sculptor
Beatrice Tonnesen (1871–1958), American artist and photographer 
Carl M. Rynning-Tønnesen (1924–2013), Norwegian police chief
Christian Rynning-Tønnesen (born 1959), Norwegian businessman
Grethe Tønnesen, Norwegian handball player
Kent Robin Tønnesen (born 1991), Norwegian handball player 
Pau Tonnesen (born 1992), Spanish decathlete 
Sverre Rynning-Tønnesen (1894–1970), Norwegian electrical engineer and civil servant 
Terje Tønnesen (born 1955), Norwegian violinist

See also
Tønnesen Glacier in Antarctica

Norwegian-language surnames